Heather A. Horst is a social anthropologist and media studies academic and author who writes on material culture, mobility, and the mediation of social relations. In 2020 she became the Director of the Institute for Culture and Society at Western Sydney University where she is a Professor and is also a lead investigator in the ARC Centre of Excellence for Automated Decision-Making and Society. Prior to this she was a professor of Media and Communications at the University of Sydney from 2017 and Vice Chancellor's Senior Research Fellow in the School of Media and Communication at RMIT University in Melbourne, Australia from 2011. She has also been a Research Fellow in the MA program in digital anthropology at University College London.

Horst has a B. A. from University of Minnesota, an M. A. from University of California, Santa Barbara, and a Ph.D. from University College, London (UCL). Horst served as an Associate Project Scientist for DML Research Hub in the Department of Humanities Research Institute at University of California, Irvine, an Honorary Research Associate in Department of Anthropology and a faculty of Social & Historical Sciences at University College London.

Horst's research focuses upon the relationship between place, space and new media. Her research has been published in a range of journals, including Social Anthropology, Current Anthropology, Journal of Material Culture, Global Networks, Identities, International Journal of Communication and the Caribbean Review of Gender Studies. She has been a guest editor for special issues of the International Journal of Communication, Journal of Material Culture, International Journal of Cultural Studies and Home Cultures. She is also the co-author of The Cell Phone: An Anthropology of Communication (Horst and Miller, Berg, 2006) and Hanging Out, Messing Around and Geeking Out: Kids Living and Learning with Digital Media (MIT Press, 2009, Ito, et al.).

Research
Heather Horst's research focuses on the relationship between material culture and the role of objects and artifacts in mediating social relations, with particular attention to mobility and the global movement of people, objects, goods, media and capital in different national and transnational spaces.

The Materiality of Personhood
The idea of starting this research came from Heather horst's 'dissertation worked in Mandeville, Jamaica, which explored the imagination, construction and transformation of the meanings of ‘home’ among Jamaicans who migrated to Britain after World War II and returned to Jamaica to retire in the 1990s.'  In this research, Heather Horst works on the relationship between material culture, property and personhood by understanding the materiality of the house assert, recognize and negotiate personhood in colonial and postcolonial Jamaica.

New Media, Technology and Society
In order to examine the relationship between new media in this research, Heather Horst began to study on the 'global and transnational processes involved in the construction of the ‘digital divide’ as part of a multi-national comparative study funded by the British Department for International Development (DFID) to examine the implications of new information and communication technologies in Ghana, India, Jamaica and South Africa working with Daniel Miller.' Also, over the past four years, Horst's study focuses on 'social change and the power dynamics surrounding the provisioning, access to and use of new media and technology by shifting my attention to the heart of the global technology industry.'

Projects

Information Society: Emergent Technologies and Development in the South
It is a large-scale DFID-funded project which compared the relationship between Information and communications technology (ICTs) and development in Ghana, India, Jamaica and South Africa. As a part of it, Heather Horst was examining development, new information and communication technologies and the 'digital divide'. After completing her dissertation, she began to examine development, new information and communication technologies and the 'digital divide' as part of it.

Digital Youth
During the time at University of California, Berkeley prior to joining University of California, Irvine, Horst was holding a position in a research project called Digital Youth which is to address the gap between in-school and out-school experience with a targeted set of ethnographic investigations into three emergent modes of informal learning that young people are practicing using new media technologies: communication, learning, and play by exploring how kids use digital media in their everyday lives.

Coming of Age in Silicon Valley Digital Media in Families

This study aims to understand the role of digital media in children and youths’ communication, learning, knowledge, play and, in turn, how digital media may affect their relationships with their peers, siblings, parents or other household members.

Virtual PlaygroundsAn Ethnography of Neopets

Working with Laura Robinson, Heather Horst, Mizuko Ito and Lou-Anthony Limon designed this project to understand practices and participation of young people using the online gaming site, Neopets.com.

Mobiles, Migrants and Money: A Study of Mobility at the Haitian-Dominican Republic Border
Heather was working with Erin Taylor, and Espelencia Baptiste on this project which investigates the role of mobile phones in the economic and social wellbeing among some of the world's poorest people living at and moving across the border of Haiti and the Dominican Republic.

Publications

New Media and Society
 Free, Social, and Inclusive: Appropriation and Resistance of New Media Technologies in Brazil. International Journal of Communication 5: 437–462, 2011
 New Media in International Contexts: Introduction (with Cara Wallis). International Journal of Communication 5: 463–470, 2011

 Hanging Out, Messing Around, and Geeking Out: Kids Living and Learning with New Media. Cambridge: MIT Press. (with Mizuko Ito, Sonja Baumer, Matteo Bittanti, danah boyd, Rachel Cody, Rebecca Herr-Stephenson, Patricia G. Lange, Dilan Mahendran, Katynka Z. Martinez, CJ Pascoe, Dan Perkel, Laura Robinson, Christo Sims and Lisa Tripp), 2009
 The Cell Phone: An Anthropology of Communication. New York: Berg Publications (Heather A. Horst and Daniel Miller), 2006
 The Blessings and Burdens of Communication: The Cell Phone in Jamaican Transnational Social Fields. Global Networks: A Journal of Transnational Affairs 6(2): 143–159, 2006
 From Kinship to Link-up: Cell Phones and Social Networking in Jamaica. Current Anthropology 46(5): 755-778 (Heather A. Horst and Daniel Miller), 2005
 ‘Cell Phone Come Like a Blessing’: Religion and the Cell Phone in a Rural Jamaican Town. Jamaica Journal 29(1&2): 12-17 (Daniel Miller and Heather A. Horst), 2005

Mobility and Transnationalism

 Jamaican Americans. New Immigrants Series. New York: Chelsea House (Heather A. Horst and Andrew Garner), 2006
 Landscaping Englishness: Respectability and Returnees in Mandeville, Jamaica. Caribbean Review of Gender Studies 2(2), 2008
 Planning to Forget: Mobility and Violence in Urban Jamaica. Social Anthropology 16 (1): 51–62, 2008
 ‘You can’t be two places at once’: Rethinking Transnationalism through Return Migration in Jamaica. Identities: Global Studies in Culture and Power 14 (1): 63–83, 2007
 The Most English Town in Jamaica: Myths, Memories and Other Returning Resident Dilemmas. Jamaica Journal 31(1 & 2): 56–61, 2007
 
Materiality of Home and Domestic Space

 Landscaping Englishness: Respectability and Returnees in Mandeville, Jamaica. Caribbean Review of Gender Studies 2(2), 2008
 Planning to Forget: Mobility and Violence in Urban Jamaica. Social Anthropology 16(1): 51–62, 2008
 The Most English Town in Jamaica: Myths, Memories and Other Returning Resident Dilemmas. Jamaica Journal 31 (1 & 2): 56–61, 2007
 A Pilgrimage Home: Tombs, Burial and Belonging in Jamaica. Journal of Material Culture 9(1): 11–26, 2004

References

External links

“Heather Horst”  Digital Youth Research
Haitian Monetary Ecologies and Repertoires: A Qualitative Snapshot of Money Transfer and Savings 
Planning to Forget: Mobility and Violence in Urban Jamaica
Heather Horst's blog Digital Youth Research
Mobile communication in the global south 
Anthropology and the Individual: A Material Culture Perspective (Berg Publications, 2009) 
“Heather A Horst” on The Material World Blog
Special Section: New Media in International Contexts Introduction 
Institute for Money, Technology and Financial Inclusion
IMTFI researcher "Heather Horst" Haitian Monetary Ecologies and Repertoires: A Qualitative Snapshot of Money Transfer and Savings
“Heather A. Horst” 2010 NCTI Technology Innovators Conference
“Heather A. Horst”  on staff directory page at University of California Humanities Research Institute (UCHRI) website

American anthropologists
Living people
University of Minnesota alumni
University of California, Santa Barbara alumni
Alumni of University College London
Year of birth missing (living people)